The Government of Navarre (Spanish: Gobierno de Navarra;) is the institution of executive nature in which the government of the Chartered Community of Navarre (Spain) is organized. It is led by the President of the Government of Navarre, and its powers are regulated in the "Amejoramiento" of 1982 in Chapter III Articles 23 to 28.

Departments of the Government of Navarre 

See also
 Navarre
 Parliament of Navarre

Notes

External links
 Government of Navarre

 
History of Navarre